is a wagashi (Japanese sweet). It resembles a dried persimmon, and is now made by filling gyūhi (a soft form of mochi) with bean jam, then sprinkling white sugar over it.

In the time when sugar was an expensive rarity, dried persimmon, made by drying astringent persimmons (Japanese: shibugaki), was a precious sweetener, and it was very commonly used in many households. At that time, wagashi was made to showcase this fine fruit, and since then it has become one of the most familiar wagashi in Japan.

See also
 Wagashi
 Gionbō-kaki (Gionbō persimmon): a type of astringent seedless Persimmon of a specialty of Akiōta, Hiroshima, Japan. Larger than Saijō persimmon (西条柿).
 Ampo kaki

References
  季の和菓子 5.求肥製「祇園坊」, Kyo-gashi Kyoto Confectionery.
  京都の美味しい　干し柿（ほしがき）　吊るし柿（つるしがき）　のお菓子 - 大原女家（おはらめや）「祇園坊（ぎおんぼう）」をたべてみた！, 京都の和菓子ドットコム.
  ふるさとブランド　祇園坊柿, すこぶる広島 Winter, vol. 57, Hiroshima Prefecture, 2005-1-31.
  祇園坊柿／ＪＡ広島市　秋の味　真空パックで, The Japan Agricultural News, 07-11-19.
  こんなにもある柿のいろいろ 第五十四回　「祇園坊（ぎおんぼう）」, 柿にまつわるおもしろ雑学　大かき八年 No. 54, 御菓子本舗「槌谷」, 2006-2-10.

Wagashi